Applied logic may refer to:
 Predicate logic, a formal system in mathematical logic
 Applied Logic Corporation, a timesharing company headquartered in Princeton, New Jersey